The Mahan Small Hydel Project is a run of the river hydel power station on the Mahan river near Korhapur village in Chhattisgarh State, India. The total capacity is 24.75 MW.

Hydroelectricity in India